Hypocnemis is a genus of passerine birds in the family Thamnophilidae. They are resident breeders in tropical Central and South America.

The genus Hypocnemis was introduced by the German ornithologist Jean Cabanis in 1847. The name combines the Ancient Greek words hupo "somewhat like" and knēmis "leggings". The type species was subsequently designated as the Guianan warbling antbird.

The genus contains eight species:
 Guianan warbling antbird, Hypocnemis cantator
 Imeri warbling antbird, Hypocnemis flavescens
 Peruvian warbling antbird, Hypocnemis peruviana
 Yellow-breasted warbling antbird, Hypocnemis subflava
 Rondonia warbling antbird, Hypocnemis ochrogyna
 Spix's warbling antbird, Hypocnemis striata
 Manicoré warbling antbird, Hypocnemis rondoni
 Yellow-browed antbird, Hypocnemis hypoxantha

The warbling antbird has traditionally been considered a single polytypic species, but recent evidence has led to it being split into six almost entirely parapatric species.

References

 
Bird genera
Taxonomy articles created by Polbot